Sadaf Espahbodi (born ) is an Iranian actress. she was won the Crystal Simorgh for Best Supporting Actress for her role in Grassland (2022).

References

External links 
 
 

Living people
1994 births
Actresses from Tehran
Crystal Simorgh for Best Supporting Actress winners